The northern flicker or common flicker (Colaptes auratus) is a medium-sized bird of the woodpecker family. It is native to most of North America, parts of Central America, Cuba, and the Cayman Islands, and is one of the few woodpecker species that migrate. Over 100 common names for the northern flicker are known, including yellowhammer (not to be confused with the Eurasian yellowhammer (Emberiza citrinella)), clape, gaffer woodpecker, harry-wicket , heigh-ho, wake-up, walk-up, wick-up, yarrup, and gawker bird. Many of these names derive from attempts to imitate some of its calls.  It is the state bird of Alabama (known by its colloquial name "yellowhammer.")

Taxonomy
The English naturalist Mark Catesby described and illustrated the northern flicker in his book The Natural History of Carolina, Florida and the Bahama Islands which was published between 1729 and 1732. Catesby used the English name "Gold-winged Wood-pecker" and the Latin Picus major alis aureis. When in 1758 the Swedish naturalist Carl Linnaeus updated his Systema Naturae for the tenth edition, he included the northern flicker, coined the binomial name Cuculus auratus and cited Catesby's book. The specific epithet auratus is a Latin word meaning "gilded" or "ornamented with gold". The type locality is South Carolina. The northern flicker is one of 13 extant New World woodpeckers now placed in the genus Colaptes that was introduced by the Irish zoologist Nicholas Aylward Vigors in 1825 with the northern flicker (Colaptes auratus) as the type species.

Subspecies
Ten subspecies are recognized, one of which is now extinct. The extant subspecies were at one time considered subspecies of two separate species called the yellow-shafted flicker (C. auratus, with four subspecies) and the red-shafted flicker (C. cafer, with six subspecies, five living and one extinct), but they commonly interbreed where their ranges overlap and are now considered one species by the American Ornithologists Union. This is an example of what is referred to in science as the species problem.

Yellow-shafted group
The southern yellow-shafted flicker (C. a. auratus) resides in the southeastern United States. It is yellow under the tail and underwings and has yellow shafts on its primaries. It has a gray cap, a beige face, and a red bar at the nape of the neck. Males have a black mustache. Colaptes comes from the Greek verb colapt, meaning "to peck"; auratus is from the Latin root aurat, meaning "gold" or "golden", and refers to the bird's underwings. As the state bird of Alabama, this subspecies is known by the common name "yellowhammer", a term that originated during the American Civil War to describe Confederate soldiers from Alabama.
The northern yellow-shafted flicker (C. a. luteus; formerly C. a. borealis) resides from central Alaska throughout most of Canada to southern Labrador, Newfoundland, and the northeastern United States.
The Cuban yellow-shafted flicker (C a. chrysocaulosus) is restricted to Cuba.
The Grand Cayman yellow-shafted flicker (C. a. gundlachi) is restricted to Grand Cayman in the Cayman Islands.

Red-shafted group
The western red-shafted flicker (C. a. cafer) resides in western North America. It is red under the tail and underwings and has red shafts on its primaries. It has a beige cap and a gray face. Males have a red mustache. The subspecific name cafer is the result of an error made in 1788 by the German systematist Johann Gmelin, who believed that its original habitat was in South Africa among the Xhosa people, then known as the "Kaffirs". As the origin of the subspecies designation is regarded as offensive by some, proposals to change the scientific name of this subspecies to C. a. lathami have been presented to the American Ornithological Society. The Society, in accordance with the rules governing scientific nomenclature, has as of September 2018 declined to support a change of the subspecific name, but may consult with the ICZN on the matter.

The coastal red-shafted flicker (C. a. collaris) has a range that closely overlaps that of C. a. cafer, extending along much of the West Coast of North America from British Columbia to northwestern Mexico.
The dwarf red-shafted flicker (C. a. nanus) resides in western Texas south to northeastern Mexico.
The Mexican red-shafted flicker (C. a. mexicanus) resides in central and southern Mexico from Durango to San Luis Potosí and Oaxaca.
The Guadalupe red-shafted flicker (C. a. rufipileus)† is extinct and was formerly restricted to Guadalupe Island, off the northwestern coast of Baja California, Mexico. It was last recorded in 1906. It may be invalid. Vagrants of an extant mainland red-shafted subspecies (which one is unknown) have recently begun recolonizing Guadalupe Island as the habitat improved after the extirpation of feral goats.
The Guatemalan red-shafted flicker (C. a. mexicanoides) resides in the highlands of southern Mexico and Central America. It is considered by some authorities to be a separate species, the Guatemalan flicker (C. mexicanoides).

Description
Adults are brown with black bars on the back and wings. Among standard scientific measurements, the wing bone measures , the tail measures , the bill measures  and the tarsus measures . The largest-bodied specimens are from the northern stretches of the species' range at the latitude of Alaska and Labrador, while the smallest specimens come from Grand Cayman Island. A necklace-like black patch occupies the upper breast, while the lower breast and belly are beige with black spots. Males can be identified by a black (in the eastern part of the species' range) or red (in the western part) mustachial stripe at the base of the beak, while females lack this stripe. The tail is dark on top, transitioning to a white rump which is conspicuous in flight. Subspecific plumage is variable.

Call and flight
This bird's call is a sustained laugh, ki ki ki ki, quite different from that of the pileated woodpecker (Dryocopus pileatus). One may also hear a constant knocking as they often drum on trees or even metal objects to declare territory. Like most woodpeckers, northern flickers drum on objects as a form of communication and territory defense. In such cases, the object is to make as loud a noise as possible, so woodpeckers sometimes drum on metal objects.

Like many woodpeckers, its flight is undulating. The repeated cycle of a quick succession of flaps followed by a pause creates an effect comparable to a roller coaster.

Diet
According to the Audubon field guide, "flickers are the only woodpeckers that frequently feed on the ground", probing with their beak, also sometimes catching insects in flight. Although they eat fruits, berries, seeds, and nuts, their primary food is insects. Ants alone can make up 45% of their diet. Other invertebrates eaten include flies, butterflies, moths, beetles, and snails. Northern flickers also eat berries and seeds, especially in winter, including those of poison ivy, poison oak, dogwood, sumac, wild cherry and grape, bayberries, hackberries, and elderberries, as well as sunflower and thistle seeds. Northern flickers often break into underground ant colonies to get at the nutritious larvae there, hammering at the soil the way other woodpeckers drill into wood. They have been observed breaking up cow dung to eat the insects living within. Their tongues can dart out  beyond the end of the bill to catch prey. The northern flicker is a natural predator of the European corn borer (Ostrinia nubilalis), an invasive species of moth that costs the U.S. agriculture industry more than $1 billion annually in crop losses and population control. As well as eating ants, northern flickers exhibit a behavior known as anting, in which they use the formic acid from the ants to assist in preening, as it is useful in keeping them free of parasites.

Influence of diet on offspring
According to an article published in Ibis, the availability of food affects the coloration of feathers in northern flicker nestlings. The article focused on the correlation between melanin spots and carotenoid-based coloration on the wings of nestlings with food stress via indirect manipulation of brood size. The article found that there was a positive correlation between the quality of the nestlings' diet and T-cell-mediated immune response. T-cell-mediated immune response was found to be positively correlated with brightness of pigmentation in flight feathers, but not related to melanin spot intensity.

Habitat
Northern flickers may be observed in open habitats near trees, including woodlands, edges, yards, and parks. In the western United States, one can find them in mountain forests all the way up to the tree line. Northern flickers generally nest in holes in trees like other woodpeckers. Occasionally, they have been found nesting in old, earthen burrows vacated by belted kingfishers (Megaceryle alcyon) or bank swallows (Riparia riparia). Both sexes help with the nest excavation. The cavity widens at the bottom to make room for the eggs and the incubating adult. Inside, the cavity is bare except for a bed of wood chips for the eggs and chicks to rest on. Once the nestlings are about 17 days old, they begin clinging to the cavity wall rather than lying on the floor. They can create cavities inside homes, especially homes of stucco or weak wooden siding.

Lifespan
A study from 2006 examined the mortality rates of male and female northern flickers over a six-year period using capture-tag-recapture techniques. The researchers observed that only one to two birds out of every 300 adults were 7 or more years old. This observation data correlated well with a mortality model that predicted a 0.6% 7-year survival rate. The data also illustrated that there were no significant differences between male and female survival rates for the general population. 
The oldest yet known "yellow-shafted" northern flicker lived to be at least 9 years 2 months old, and the oldest yet known “red-shafted” northern flicker lived to be at least 8 years 9 months old.

Reproduction
The northern flicker's breeding habitat consists of forested areas across North America and as far south as Central America. They are cavity nesters which typically nest in trees, but they also use posts and birdhouses if sized and situated appropriately. They prefer to excavate their own home, although they reuse and repair damaged or abandoned nests. Abandoned northern flicker nests create habitat for other cavity nesters. Northern flickers are sometimes driven away from their nesting sites by another cavity nester, the common starling (Sturnus vulgaris).

About 1 to 2 weeks are needed for a mated pair to build the nest. A typical clutch consists of six to eight eggs whose shells are pure white with a smooth surface and high gloss. The eggs are the second-largest of the North American woodpecker species, exceeded only by the pileated woodpecker's. Incubation is by both sexes for about 11 to 12 days. The young are fed by regurgitation and fledge about 25 to 28 days after hatching.

Wintering and migration
Northern birds of this species migrate to the southern parts of the range; southern birds are often permanent residents.

Gallery

References

External links

Northern Flicker Species Account - Cornell Lab of Ornithology
Northern Flicker - Colaptes auratus - USGS Patuxent Bird Identification InfoCenter
A sample of the call of a Northern Flicker by the USGS
Stamps (for Antigua, Cayman Islands, Cuba, Saint Pierre and Miquelon, United States) (imperfect Range Map) at bird-stamps.org

 
Calls of the northern flicker at Animal Diversity Web
 Northern (Yellow-shafted) Flicker Bird Sound at Florida Museum of Natural History

northern flicker
Birds of North America
Birds of Saint Pierre and Miquelon
Birds of Cuba
Birds of the Cayman Islands
northern flicker
northern flicker
Symbols of Alabama